HMS Sheldrake was a Royal Navy 10-gun  launched in 1825 at Pembroke. In 1827 she became a Post Office Packet Service packet, sailing out of Falmouth, Cornwall. She was sold in 1855 for breaking up.

External links
 Ships of the Old Navy

1825 ships
Brigs of the Royal Navy
Cherokee-class brig-sloops
Packet (sea transport)